"Kayleigh" is a song by the British neo-progressive rock band Marillion.

Kayleigh may also refer to:

People
Kaylee, given name, including list of people named Kayleigh
Layla Kayleigh (born 1985),  British-American TV personality and actress

See also
Caylee (name), given name
Cayley (disambiguation)
Kaley (disambiguation)
Cèilidh, Scottish dance